USS Lovering has been the name of multiple United States Navy ships, and may refer to:

 , a destroyer escort in commission from 1943 to 1945

United States Navy ship names